A common year starting on Saturday is any non-leap year (i.e. a year with 365 days) that begins on Saturday, 1 January, and ends on Saturday, 31 December. Its dominical letter hence is B. The most recent year of such kind was 2022 and the next one will be 2033 in the Gregorian calendar or, likewise, 2017 and 2023 in the obsolete Julian calendar.  See below for more.

Any common year that starts on Wednesday, Friday or Saturday has only one Friday the 13th: the only one in this common year occurs in May. Leap years starting on Friday share this characteristic.

In this common year, Martin Luther King Jr. Day is on January 17, Valentine's Day is on a Monday, Presidents' Day is on its latest possible date, February 21, Saint Patrick's Day is on a Thursday, Juneteenth is on a Sunday, U.S. Independence Day and Halloween are on a Monday, Memorial Day is on May 30, Labor Day is on September 5, Election Day in the USA is on its latest possible date, November 8th, Thanksgiving is on November 24 and Christmas is on a Sunday.

Calendars

Applicable years

Gregorian Calendar 
In the (currently used) Gregorian calendar, alongside Sunday, Monday, Wednesday or Friday, the fourteen types of year (seven common, seven leap) repeat in a 400-year cycle (20871 weeks). Forty-three common years per cycle or exactly 10.75% start on a Saturday. The 28-year sub-cycle will break at a century year which is not divisible by 400 (e.g. it broke at the year 1900 but not at the year 2000).

400 year cycle

century 1:  5, 11, 22, 33, 39, 50, 61, 67, 78, 89, 95

century 2:  101, 107, 118, 129, 135, 146, 157, 163, 174, 185, 191

century 3:  203, 214, 225, 231, 242, 253, 259, 270, 281, 287, 298

century 4:  310, 321, 327, 338, 349, 355, 366, 377, 383, 394

Julian Calendar 
In the now-obsolete Julian calendar, the fourteen types of year (seven common, seven leap) repeat in a 28-year cycle (1461 weeks). A leap year has two adjoining dominical letters, (one for January and February and the other for March to December in the Church of England, as 29 February has no letter). Each of the seven two-letter sequences occurs once within a cycle, and every common letter thrice.

As the Julian calendar repeats after 28 years that means it will also repeat after 700 years, i.e. 25 cycles. The year's position in the cycle is given by the formula ((year + 8) mod 28) + 1). Years 10, 16 and 27 of the cycle are common years beginning on Saturday. 2017 is year 10 of the cycle. Approximately 10.71% of all years are common years beginning on Saturday.

References 

Gregorian calendar
Julian calendar
Saturday